Arlington Louis "Ali" Highsmith (born January 20, 1985) is a former professional American football linebacker. He was signed by the Arizona Cardinals of the National Football League (NFL) as an undrafted free agent in 2008. He played college football at Louisiana State University.

Early years
Highsmith played high school football at Central High School in Miami, Florida.

Professional career

Arizona Cardinals
Highsmith went undrafted in the 2008 NFL Draft and was signed by the Arizona Cardinals shortly following the draft.

In 2008, Highsmith made the team out of training camp and went on to appear in six games for the Cardinals as a rookie before being placed on season-ending injured reserve with a knee injury on November 4. He finished the season with four tackles.

Highsmith was waived by the Cardinals on December 22, 2009, and re-signed to the team's practice squad the following day. He was re-signed to a future contract on January 18, 2010.

He was waived on August 3, 2010.

San Diego Chargers
Highsmith was claimed off waivers by the San Diego Chargers on August 5, 2010. He was waived on August 13.

External links

Arizona Cardinals bio
LSU Tigers bio
"Former LSU, NFL player arrested for marijuana"

1985 births
Living people
Miami Central Senior High School alumni
Players of American football from Miami
American football linebackers
LSU Tigers football players
Arizona Cardinals players
San Diego Chargers players